Olearia tubuliflora, commonly known as rayless daisy-bush, is a species of flowering plant in the family Asteraceae and is endemic to south-eastern continental Australia. It is a slender, erect shrub with linear or narrowly elliptic leaves and yellow, daisy-like inflorescences but with the ray florets lacking a ligule.

Description
Each head has 3 to 5 ray florets lacking a ligule, surrounding 3 to 6 yellow disc florets.

Taxonomy
This daisy was first formally described in 1853 by Otto Wilhelm Sonder and Ferdinand von Mueller who gave it the name Eurybia tubuliflora in the journal Linnaea, based on plant material collected from the Mount Lofty Ranges. In 1867 by George Bentham changed the name to Olearia tubuliflora in Flora Australiensis.

Distribution and habitat
Olearia tubuliflora grows in forest and woodland in north-central Victoria and in the south-east of South Australia.

References

Asterales of Australia
tubuliflora
Flora of South Australia
Flora of Victoria (Australia)
Taxa named by Otto Wilhelm Sonder
Taxa named by Ferdinand von Mueller
Plants described in 1853